The 2016 Fresno mayoral election was held on June 6, 2016 and November 8, 2016 to elect the mayor of Fresno, California. It saw the election of Lee Brand.

Municipal elections in California are officially non-partisan.

Incumbent mayor Ashley Swearengin was term-limited.

Results

First round

Runoff results

References 

2016 California elections
2016 United States mayoral elections
2016 mayoral election
June 2016 events in the United States
2016
November 2016 events in the United States